Ch'ŏnjin station is a railway station in Ch'ŏnjin-dong, Kaech'ŏn municipal city, South P'yŏngan province, North Korea. It is the terminus of the Kaech'ŏn Colliery Line of the Korean State Railway.

References

Railway stations in North Korea